The 1964 United States presidential election in Colorado took place on November 3, 1964, as part of the 1964 United States presidential election. State voters chose six representatives, or electors, to the Electoral College, who voted for president and vice president.

Colorado was won by incumbent President Lyndon B. Johnson (D–Texas), with 61.27% of the popular vote, against Senator Barry Goldwater (R–Arizona), with 38.19% of the popular vote.

, this is the last election in which Archuleta County, Baca County, Crowley County, Custer County, Delta County, Douglas County, El Paso County, Fremont County, Grand County, Jackson County, Kiowa County, Kit Carson County, Lincoln County, Logan County, Mesa County, Moffat County, Montezuma County, Montrose County, Morgan County, Park County, Rio Blanco County, Rio Grande County, Sedgwick County, Teller County, Weld County, and Yuma County voted for a Democratic presidential candidate. Colorado would not back a Democrat in a presidential election again until 1992. Arapahoe County, Jefferson County and Ouray County would not vote Democratic again until 2008.

Results

Results by county

References

Colorado
1964
1964 Colorado elections